A by-election was held for the Australian House of Representatives seat of Australian Capital Territory on 30 May 1970. This was triggered by the death of Labor MP Jim Fraser.

The by-election was won by Labor candidate Kep Enderby. It was also notable for recording the highest vote ever received in a federal electorate by an Australia Party candidate.

Ted Cawthron from the National Socialist Party of Australia was the first National Socialist in Australia to run for public office.

Results

References

1970 elections in Australia
Australian Capital Territory federal by-elections
1970s in the Australian Capital Territory
May 1970 events in Australia